Uti vår hage may refer to:

 Uti vår hage (comic strip), Swedish comic strip and associated magazine
 Uti vår hage (song), Swedish folk song
 Uti vår hage (TV series), Norwegian comedy sketch show